The mixed NOC team figure skating competition of the 2012 Winter Youth Olympics was held at the Olympiahalle in Innsbruck. The eight teams were composed of one men's single skater, one ladies' single skater, and one ice dancing duo, each performing a free program or free dance. Pairs were not included due to the low number of entries (five pairs total).

Teams
The skaters who took part the team trophy was determined by draw. The result of the draw was that none of the ladies' medalists, Elizaveta Tuktamysheva, Adelina Sotnikova and Li Zijun, could take part in this competition.

Results
Due to a tie between the two top ranked teams, a tie breaking procedure was used, taking into consideration the two best places of the concerned teams in different categories. The highest total points from the two best places prevailed and the respective placings was recorded accordingly. In the case of the ties for 4th rank by overall points, the three best places in different categories was considered and the highest total scores from the three best places prevailed and the respective placings was recorded accordingly.

Detailed results

Men

Ladies

Ice dancing

References

ISU results

Figure skating at the 2012 Winter Youth Olympics

pl:Łyżwiarstwo figurowe na Zimowych Igrzyskach Olimpijskich Młodzieży 2012 - solistki